Movsar Buharovich Barayev (Suleimanov) (October 26, 1979 – October 26, 2002), earlier known as Suleimanov, was a Chechen Islamist militia leader during the Second Chechen War, who led the seizure of a Moscow theater that led to the deaths of over 170 people by Russian special forces.

Life
Movsar Barayev, born 1979, was the nephew of the notorious Chechen warlord Arbi Barayev who allegedly worked under FSB guidance. After his uncle's death in June 2001 until his own, Movsar was the leader of a Chechen terrorist militia known as the Special Purpose Islamic Regiment (SPIR). Mosvar Barayev was said to be a sworn enemy of the Chechen leader and elected president, Aslan Maskhadov. He used the nom-de-guerre of "Yassir".

He was incorrectly reported by the command of the Russian forces in Chechnya to have been killed on August 21, 2001, and again on October 12, 2002, eleven days prior to the Moscow theater crisis (this report of Barayev's death came from Colonel Boris Podoprigora, deputy commander of Russia's Joint Group Forces). It was also claimed that two months before the hostage-taking, the Russian GRU military intelligence had arrested Barayev and contained him "until his release had provided leads to the hostage taking at the Dubrovka theatre".

Death
On October 23, 2002, Barayev and a mysterious man known as "Abu Bakar" led a group of some forty SPIR militants and their family members (who had dubbed themselves "the suicide squad from the 29th Division") to seize the theater in the Russian capital Moscow, demanding negotiations with Russian authorities for an end to the second war in Chechnya, withdrawal of Russian forces and Chechen independence, threatening to execute his hostages.

Movsar Barayev was killed on the third day of the crisis, when the Russian FSB special forces stormed the theater. He died on his 23rd birthday. Barayev's bloodied corpse was shown by the Russian TV lying on the ground of the theater amid broken glass with an intact bottle of cognac near his hand. Later, the Russian authorities said his body was secretly buried in an undisclosed location.

References

External links

Who is Movsar Barayev? , Gazeta.ru, 24 October 2002
Chechen rebel an unlikely leader, San Francisco Chronicle, October 25, 2002
Barayev Known More for Gun Exploits Than Religious Devotion, The Moscow Times, October 26, 2002
The Man Who Would Be Martyred, TIME, Oct. 27, 2002
A Son of Perestroika, Moscow News, October 30, 2002

1979 births
2002 deaths
Chechen field commanders
Islamic terrorism in Russia
Moscow theater hostage crisis
People of the Chechen wars
Russian Sunni Muslims
Chechen warlords
Russian people of Chechen descent
Chechen people
Leaders of Islamic terror groups
Russian mass murderers